Magdalena Streijffert (born 1977) is a Swedish social democratic politician. She was a member of the Riksdag between 2006 and 2010.

External links
Magdalena Streijffert at the Riksdag website

Members of the Riksdag 2006–2010
Living people
1977 births
Women members of the Riksdag
Swedish republicans
21st-century Swedish women politicians
Members of the Riksdag from the Social Democrats